Purnema is a rural locality (a selo) in Pokrovskoye Rural Settlement of Onezhsky District, Arkhangelsk Oblast, Russia. The population was 169 as of 2010. There are 3 streets.

Geography 
Purnema is located 104 km northwest of Onega (the district's administrative centre) by road. Nizhmozero is the nearest rural locality.

References 

Rural localities in Onezhsky District
Onezhsky Uyezd